Antidesma tomentosum is a species of plant in the family Phyllanthaceae. It is native to Borneo, Java, Peninsular Malaysia, the Nicobar Islands, the Philippines, Sulawesi, Sumatra and Thailand.

References

Flora of Borneo
Flora of Java
Flora of Peninsular Malaysia
Flora of the Nicobar Islands
Flora of the Philippines
Flora of Sulawesi
Flora of Sumatra
Flora of Thailand
tomentosum
Taxonomy articles created by Polbot